The Secretary of the Central Committee of the League of Communists of Macedonia was the head of the League of Communists of Macedonia, heading the Central Committee of the Party. The holder of the office was, for a significant period, the de facto most influential politician in the Socialist Republic of Macedonia, a constituent republic of Yugoslavia. The official name of the office was changed in May 1982 from "Secretary of the Central Committee" to President of the Presidency of the Central Committee of the League of Communists of Macedonia (Претседател на Президиумот на Централниот комитет на Сојузот на комунистите на Македонија).

The League of Communists of Macedonia was also an organization subordinate to the federal-level League of Communists of Yugoslavia. Between March 1943 and September 1952, the former was named the Communist Party of Macedonia (being part of the larger Communist Party of Yugoslavia), until both parties were renamed "League of Communists" in 1952.

List

Here follows a list of the eight officeholders:

See also
League of Communists of Macedonia
League of Communists of Yugoslavia
Socialist Republic of Macedonia
President of North Macedonia
Prime Minister of North Macedonia
List of presidents of the Assembly of the Republic of North Macedonia
List of heads of state of Yugoslavia
Prime Minister of Yugoslavia
Politics of North Macedonia

References

Communism in North Macedonia
League of Communists of Macedonia politicians